Gran Tuc de Colomers is a mountain of Catalonia, Spain. Located in the Pyrenees, it has an altitude of 2933 metres above sea level.

References

Mountains of Catalonia
Mountains of the Pyrenees